Bahnar may refer to:

Bahnar people of Vietnam
Bahnar language
Bahnaric languages